Kinesin light chain 3 is a protein that in humans is encoded by the KLC3 gene.

Function 

This gene encodes a member of the kinesin light chain gene family. Kinesins are molecular motors involved in the transport of cargo along microtubules, and are composed of two kinesin heavy chain (KHC) and two kinesin light chain (KLC) molecules. KLCs are thought to typically be involved in binding cargo and regulating kinesin activity. In the rat, a protein similar to this gene product is expressed in post-meiotic spermatids, where it associates with structural components of sperm tails and mitochondria.

Interactions 

KLC3 has been shown to interact with YWHAH.

References

Further reading